= Salmon River Dam Formation =

- Stratigraphic range: early Ordovician – Late Ordovician
- Type: Formation
- Unit of: Baie d'Espoir Group

Lithology
- Primary: Siliciclastic marine sandstones

Location
- Region: Newfoundland
- Country: Canada
- Occurrence of the Salmon River Dam Formation in southeastern Newfoundland

The Salmon River Dam Formation is a formation cropping out in Newfoundland.
